"Losing You" is the debut single by Dead by April and is the first single from their self-titled debut album Dead by April. The single was released on 6 March 2009. "Losing You" is the first physical CD single by the band. The single was only released in Europe with only the title track, but in support of their UK tour they gave out a reissue of the single entitled "Losing You/My Saviour" in the UK, which features an alternative version of the title track and the previously unreleased track "My Saviour".

Track listing
EU CD single

Promo CD

UK CD single

iTunes single

UK/iTunes EP

Charts

Weekly charts

Year-end charts

Personnel 
 Jimmie Strimell - lead vocals (clean and unclean)
 Pontus Hjelm - backing vocals, guitar, keyboards
 Johan Olsson - guitar
 Marcus Wesslén - bass guitar
 Alexander Svenningson - drums

References

External links
Losing You official music video

Number-one singles in Sweden
2009 debut singles
Dead by April songs
Songs written by Pontus Hjelm
2009 songs
Universal Music Group singles